The 1998 Pan American Men's Handball Championship was the eighth edition of the tournament, held in Havana, Cuba from 22 to 29 September 1998. It acted as the American qualifying tournament for the 1999 World Championship, where the top three placed team qualied.

Preliminary round
All times are local (UTC−4).

Group A

Group B

Knockout stage

Bracket

Fifth place bracket

Quarterfinals

5–8th place semifinals

Semifinals

Seventh place game

Fifth place game

Third place game

Final

Final ranking

External links
Results on todor66.com

Pan American Men's Handball Championship
1998 in handball
1998 in Cuban sport
International handball competitions hosted by Cuba
September 1998 sports events in North America